Cuccaro Monferrato (Cucri in Piemontese) is a comune (municipality) in the Province of Alessandria in the Italian region Piedmont, located about  east of Turin and about  northwest of Alessandria.

Cuccaro Monferrato borders the following municipalities: Camagna Monferrato, Fubine, Lu, Quargnento, and Vignale Monferrato.

The Swedish former footballer Nils Liedholm resided there and ran a vineyard, and his son Carlo runs it today.

References

Cities and towns in Piedmont